The Turkish State Mint (Turkish: Darphane) is a state-owned mint situated in Istanbul that is responsible for minting the coinage of Turkey. Originally founded in 1467, the mint replaced the Constantinople Mint as the largest mint of the Ottoman Empire to become its successor. Mention of the mint's establishment was recorded in the documents of Mehmed the Conqueror.

See also
List of mints
Central Bank of the Republic of Turkey

References

External links

Mints (currency)
Manufacturing companies based in Istanbul
1467 establishments in the Ottoman Empire
Bullion dealers